Richard Jasiewicz (second ¼ 1957) is an English former professional rugby league footballer who played in the 1980s and 1990s.

Background
Dick Jasiewicz's birth was registered in Spen Valley, West Riding of Yorkshire, England.

Playing career

International honours
Dick Jasiewicz won a cap for Great Britain while at Bradford Northern in 1984 against France.

County Cup Final appearances
Dick Jasiewicz played as an  interchange/substitute, i.e. number 15, (replacing  Gary Van Bellen) in Bradford Northern's 5-10 defeat by Castleford in the 1981 Yorkshire County Cup Final during the 1981–82 season at Headingley Rugby Stadium, Leeds on Saturday 3 October 1981, and played right-, i.e. number 12, in the 7-18 defeat by Hull F.C. in the 1982 Yorkshire County Cup Final during the 1981–82 season at Elland Road, Leeds on Saturday 2 October 1982.

Outside of rugby league
Dick Jasiewicz ran Dickies Gym, 1st Floor, Hickwell Mills, Hick Lane, Batley, which was used by professional boxer Josh Warrington, as of 2018 he lives in Thailand for 9-months of the year.

References

External links
!Great Britain Statistics at englandrl.co.uk (statistics currently missing due to not having appeared for both Great Britain, and England)
Photograph "The Mayor shows off the Trophy" at rlhp.co.uk
Photograph "Jasiewicz held" at rlhp.co.uk
Photograph "Young Jasiewicz" at rlhp.co.uk
Photograph "Bradford Northern's Yorkshire Cup squad 1982" at rlhp.co.uk
Photograph "Northern's Cup semi final squad 1983" at rlhp.co.uk
Photograph "Dick on the move" at rlhp.co.uk

1957 births
Living people
Bradford Bulls players
Doncaster R.L.F.C. players
English people of Polish descent
English rugby league players
Great Britain national rugby league team players
Rugby league locks
Rugby league players from Batley
Rugby league second-rows
Wakefield Trinity players